Asola may refer to the following :

Places and jurisdictions 
 Asola, Lombardy, in the province of Mantua, northwestern Italy
 its collegiate cathedral Sant'Andrea was the 'see' of a single-parish Abbey nullius of Asola (1509-1818)
 Asola (Delhi), in the district of South Delhi in the state of Delhi
 , a district of Vantaa, Finland

People 
 Giammateo Asola (died 1609), Italian composer